Unlimited is the tenth studio album by Bassnectar, released on June 17, 2016. Bassnectar stated that the goal of the album was to build a "sonic collage".

Reception

Writing for Exclaim!, Dylan Barnabe praised the album's "amorphous style" and hailed it as "a welcome addition to the veteran's discography."

The album debuted  at No. 49 on Billboard 200, No. 1 on the Top Dance/Electronic Albums chart, selling 9,000 copies in its first week.

Track listing

Charts

Weekly charts

Year-end charts

References

2016 albums
Bassnectar albums